Nové Mesto (meaning New Town) is a borough of Bratislava, in the Bratislava III district. It is located north and north-east of the Old Town. The borough also borders Rača, Vajnory, Ružinov, Lamač and Záhorská Bystrica boroughs.

History
There was no compact settlement in the Middle Ages in the cadastral area of present-day borough, and for long it had countryside character. Three roads passed throughout the area: one from Bratislava to Modra, second to Vajnory and the third to Trnava and Nitra. The Little Carpathians part was almost untouched, with the exception of upper Mlynská dolina valley. The area started to have city-like character since the 18th century from two squares, which still have word "mýto" (meaning toll) in their name: Račianske mýto and Trnavské mýto, although no tolls are collected today.
The parts of the city name was Nádorváros in the 19th century.
Some of the factories established in the 19th century include Stein brewery in 1872–1873, Figaro chocolate factory in 1896 or Dynamit-Nobel dynamite factory in 1873. The area was massively urbanized in the 20th century.

Sport
During the World War II, as the borough of Petržalka was occupied by Nazi Germany and the city lost almost all sporting facilities, the city started building new facilities in locality known as Tehelné pole and later also Pasienky. The swimming pool was built as first in 1939. Another of the sporting facilities is the football stadium built in years 1939–1944, home of the ŠK Slovan Bratislava football club. In 1962, another football stadium, called Pasienky was built. The Ondrej Nepela Winter Sports Stadium, now called Samsung Arena, was built in 1938, but covered only twenty years later. Other venues include cycling stadium (built 1946, demolished 2010), indoor swimming pool Pasienky (built 1973), sports hall Mladosť (built 1987) and the National Tennis Centre (built 2003).

Sights and places of interest
Nové Mesto is located near the Little Carpathians, and around half of the whole cadastral area is covered by Bratislava Forest Park, with one of the attractions being the Kamzík TV Tower. In the city itself, there is a station of horse-drawn railway from 1840 (leading to Svätý Jur at the time of opening) and the Nová doba Estate, a fine example of modernist architecture.

References

Citations

General references

External links
Official website

Boroughs of Bratislava